Omocerini is a Neotropical tribe of tortoise beetles containing 12 genera and about 145 species. Individuals use plants in the genera Borago and Cordia (Boraginaceae) and Hyptis (Lamiaceae) as host plants. The life cycle of one species has been described.

References

Cassidinae
Polyphaga tribes